Sally MacKenzie is a USA Today bestselling romance novelist who has currently published eight books, The Naked Duke (2005), The Naked Marquis (2006), The Naked Earl (2007), The Naked Gentleman (2008), The Naked Baron (2009), The Naked Viscount (2010), The Naked King (2011), and Bedding Lord Ned (2012).

According to Romance Reviews Today, The Naked Marquis is “… charming … funny … full of delightful characters… The Naked Marquis merits a place on the keeper shelves of readers of the traditional Regency and the spicier Regency-set historical romances alike".

MacKenzie lives in Maryland and is a mother of four.

Works 
The Naked Duke (2005)
 The Naked Marquis (2006)
 The Naked Earl (2007)
 The Naked Gentleman (2008)
 The Naked Baron (2009)
 The Naked Viscount (2010)
 The Naked King (2011)
 The duchess of love,  Tantor Media, Inc., 2012. , 
 Bedding Lord Ned, Tantor Media, 2012. , 
 Surprising Lord Jack, Zebra Books/Kensington Pub., Co., 2013. , 
 Loving Lord Ash,  Tantor Audio, 2014. , 
 When to engage an earl, New York, NY : Zebra Books, 2017. ,

Notes

References
Official Site 

Living people
Year of birth missing (living people)
21st-century American novelists
American romantic fiction writers
American women novelists
Women romantic fiction writers
21st-century American women writers